The Elijah Filley Stone Barn is a historic barn in Filley, Nebraska. It was built in 1874 with limestone quarried by Ammi Filley for his son, Elijah, and his daughter-in-law, Emily. Elijah Filley became an accomplished farmer, and he served as a member of the Nebraska House of Representatives from 1880 to 1881, and as a member of the Nebraska Senate from 1882 to 1883. The barn has been listed on the National Register of Historic Places since April 11, 1977.

References

Barns on the National Register of Historic Places in Nebraska
National Register of Historic Places in Gage County, Nebraska
Buildings and structures completed in 1874